Wax palm can refer to several species of palms, including:

The genus Ceroxylon, particularly Ceroxylon quindiuense
Copernicia alba
Copernicia prunifera, the carnauba wax palm
Cyrtostachys renda, the red candle-wax palm